Gamraj is an Indian comic book character, one of a number of titles published by Raj Comics.

Plot summary
Gamraj is the son of Yamraj, the god of death in Hindu Mythology. He has been living on earth among normal people as he has been very emotional and sentimental and requested his father to allow him to go and live on earth as he wanted to help the people here. His father permitted him to go but he also sent Yamunda, the buffalo who was the son of Yamraj's buffalo. His buffalo's name was Mahish. Yamunda has heavenly powers of disappearing and can appear when Gamraj calls him and also he can transform into any vehicle he wants.

On Earth, Gamraj met Shankalu who has been living with his wife Ratalu and their 12 kids who help Gamraj in solving people's problems along with their own (as Yamunda is a regular ride for Shankalu's family).

Lanky likeable teenager who always laughs his troubles away.
Gamraj has a knack of inviting troubles and landing himself into the soup.
T-shirt and jeans are his standard wear.
Bizarre characters confront Gamraj creating hilarious comic scenes laced with suspense and thrills.
Helping out poor and down trodden is his habit.

Attributes
Height: 5'10" (1.78 m)

Weight: 62 kg (137 lb)

Hair: Dark

Eyes: Brown

Nose: Hawkish

Face: longish

Powers and abilities
His power is his pet young bull buffalo Yamunda bestowed with the divine power of transforming into anything wished by his master. Yamunda is a gift to Gamraj from the Gods as an apology for their blunders.

Family, friends, and allies
 Shankalu: Friend and a guy who doubts everything. The pint size is married to a battletank of a woman and has a dozen noisy kids. His home has no space for anything. Making mountains out of molehills is his nature. He lives in poverty. The only valuable thing in his life is his close friendship with Gamraj. He is Gamraj console in comedy.
 Yamunda: The son of Yamraj's mount. A bull buffalo which can transform into anything. The bull has a jolly nature and shares many jokes. Yamunda helps Gamraj take on any trouble through the use of its horns.
 Yamraj: Father And God Of Death as per Hindu Mythology

Enemies
 Loudspeaker: His voice is diabolical. His whispers creates storms, his walk has the effect of exploding bombs and his shriek can cause all hell to break loose. It takes a lot to silence him.
 Sir Fode: Sir Fode is a headcracker. He loves anything that brings a mighty bill. He pays it with a skull-cracker bang on the head of the bill presenter with his own steely head.
 Speed Breaker: He creates phony speed breakers on the roads to benefit goods carriers. The bumps make the carriers spill some of their wads. Speed Breaker lived on spilled goods until Gamraj intervened.

Comics Title
Rs 10 Comic

 Budiya Ke Baal
 Khota Sikka
 Maskhara
 Tulatod
 Chaal Khali
 Kalpurje
 Teen Tigada
 Gunde Chuhe
 Mere Bharat Mahaan
 Takaat Ke Chor
 Juta Ji
 Laddu
 Doctor Bandar
 Ladaai Ladaai Maaf Karo
 Bojh Hatao
 Gatar Chaurashi
 Car Chor
 Polio Gang
 Doorbeen
 Mastkalandar
 Chhotmantar
 Kali Kalantar
 Kala Bandar
 Goggle
 Ko Kalachi Paki
 Soldier
 Adal Badal
 Tarzan Ka Beta
 Coolie No. 1
 Bolo Mere Aaka
 Anpad Lutera
 Tap Tap Tapori
 Roti, Kapda Aur Makaan
 Pilpila Lala
 Jaani Dushman

Rs 20 Comic

 Jungle Me Dungle
 Hungama
 Naak Me Dum
 Mumbai Pareshaan
 Muhnuchwa
 Shaitaan Raag
 Satellite Boss
 Chakka Jaam
 Bhoot Polish
 Beghar
 Baap Ka Raaz Hai
 Doari Danda
 Gunda Gamraj, Khooni Doga
 Jhagdaloosh
 Hightech Bhoot
 Koi Hil Gaya
 Kar Ya Mar
 Mapose Ram Bharose
 Tunna Bhai MBBS
 Khana Kharaab
 Jal Surma
 Budhumaan
 Jhanda Neecha Rahe Tumhara
 Clonewar
 Chitrasen
 Govinda Aala Re
 Father Phobia
 Jhanse Ki Rani
 Jungle Pandey
 Remote Man
 Life Boy
 Sanki Bhai
 Cementa

Rs 25 Comic

 Aa Maut Mujhe Maar

Other Appearances
World Comics & Graphic Novels News (WCGNN)
Gamraj (Trendy Baba Series, Book # 05) 
Fang Magazine
Indian Comics Fandom Magazine
Vigyapans (Trendy Baba Series, Book # 07)
Heroes in Real Harsh World Series

Discussion forum
Raj Comics hosts a discussion forum, with a section specially devoted to Gamraj.
 Forum by Raj Comics

Indian comics
Raj Comics characters
Indian mythology in popular culture
Hindu mythology in popular culture
Humour and wit characters of India